Gottifredi is a surname of Italian origin.

People with the name
 Aloysius Gottifredi (1595–1652), Italian Jesuit leader
 Mariano Gottifredi (born 1930), Italian Olympic rower
 Vanesa Gottifredi (born 1969), Argentine chemist and biologist

Italian-language surnames
Patronymic surnames
Surnames from given names